Guy Roland Demel (born 13 June 1981) is an Ivorian former professional footballer who played as a defender.

He could play in several positions including right back and centre back. Demel started his career in France with Nîmes Olympique before joining English club Arsenal in 2000. He then played in Germany for ten years, signing for Borussia Dortmund in 2001 and then Hamburger SV in 2005. He returned to England with West Ham United in 2011, leaving the club in 2015 and subsequently joining Dundee United.

Demel was born in France but represented the Ivory Coast national team from 2004 until his international retirement in 2012, making 35 appearances. He was in the Ivorian squad for the 2006 and 2010 World Cups and the 2006 Africa Cup of Nations.

Club career
Born in Orsay, France, Demel started his professional career in the French Ligue 2 with Nîmes Olympique. He was signed by Arsenal in August 2000 spending one season in London without making a first team appearance before being transferred to Borussia Dortmund. He made his Bundesliga debut in 2003 winning the Bundesliga and making UEFA Cup Final in his first season. Demel left Dortmund to join Hamburg in 2005, after struggling to hold down a first team place.

With Hamburg, Demel played regularly as both a right back and a midfielder. In May 2006, he signed a new contract with Hamburg, tying him to the club until 2010.

Demel was released by Hamburg at the expiry of his contract in 2011. He made 199 appearances for Hamburg including 52 in European football in the UEFA Cup, UEFA Europa League and the 2006–07 UEFA Champions League, scoring four goals.

West Ham United
He signed a two-year deal, with the option of a third, with West Ham on 31 August 2011. Due to injuries it was not until 29 November 2011, in a 2–0 away win against Middlesbrough, that Demel made his West Ham United debut. With West Ham playing in the Championship, Demel played 10 games in the 2011–12 season, eight of them after coming on as substitute. On 19 May 2012, he was a member of the team which won promotion to the Premier League after beating Blackpool in the 2012 Football League Championship play-off Final at Wembley Stadium. He played the first 57 minutes before being replaced by Julien Faubert.  On 23 January 2013, Demel extended his contract with West Ham until 2015. Demel scored his only West Ham goal in a 2–1 home defeat by Liverpool on 6 April 2014. After West Ham striker, Andy Carroll challenged Liverpool goalkeeper, Simon Mignolet, the goalkeeper dropped the ball and Demel scored from  out. Demel was first-choice right-back for the 2012–13 and 2013–14 seasons playing 31 and 32 games respectively. By the 2014–15 season, Carl Jenkinson was first-choice and Demel managed only six games all season.  He was released at the end of the 2014–15 season.

Dundee United
In November 2015, Demel signed for Dundee United until the end of the 2015–16 season. He scored his first goal for Dundee United in a 2–1 win over Hearts on 20 February 2016. Following confirmation of the club's relegation from the Scottish Premiership, Demel was allowed to leave the club and return to France before the end of the season, despite still being under contract.

International career

In 2004, Demel, a French citizen, acquired an Ivorian passport. He has since been selected for the national team, playing at the 2006 Africa Cup of Nations, and being named to the squad for the 2006 and 2010 World Cup finals. Demel announced his retirement from international football on 6 December 2012 confirming his wish to focus on his club career with West Ham United.

Career statistics

International
Source:

Honours

Club
Borussia Dortmund
Bundesliga: 2001–02

Hamburger SV
UEFA Intertoto Cup: 2005, 2007

West Ham United
 Football League Championship play-offs: 2011–12

International
Ivory Coast
Africa Cup of Nations runner-up:2006

References

External links

 
 
 
 
 

1981 births
Living people
Footballers from Essonne
Association football defenders
French footballers
Citizens of Ivory Coast through descent
Ivorian footballers
Ivory Coast international footballers
Ivorian expatriate footballers
Nîmes Olympique players
Arsenal F.C. players
Borussia Dortmund players
Borussia Dortmund II players
Hamburger SV players
Hamburger SV II players
West Ham United F.C. players
Dundee United F.C. players
Athlético Marseille players
Red Star F.C. players
Bundesliga players
English Football League players
Premier League players
Scottish Professional Football League players
Ligue 2 players
Championnat National players
Expatriate footballers in England
Expatriate footballers in Germany
French sportspeople of Ivorian descent
2006 Africa Cup of Nations players
2010 Africa Cup of Nations players
2006 FIFA World Cup players
2010 FIFA World Cup players
Ivorian expatriate sportspeople in Germany
Ivorian expatriate sportspeople in England
Expatriate footballers in Scotland
Ivorian expatriate sportspeople in Scotland